Santa Maria della Mercede e Sant'Adriano a Villa Albani ([ˈsanta maˈriːa ˈdɛlla merˈtʃeːde e santaˈdrjaːno a ˈvilla alˈbaːni]) is a 20th-century parochial church and titular church in north-central Rome, dedicated to Mary of Mercies and Adrian of Nicomedia.

History 
Santa Maria della Mercede e Sant'Adriano a Villa Albani was built in 1958. It is named for Mary of Mercies, as the parish is administered by the Order of the Blessed Virgin Mary of Mercy (Mercedarians). It is also named for Adrian of Nicomedia (d. AD 306) in honour of Sant'Adriano al Foro, a deconsecrated church in the Roman Forum; a holy water font and some altars were brought to the new church from Sant'Adriano.

On 7 June 1967, it was made a titular church to be held by a cardinal-deacon.

Cardinal-Protectors
John Krol (1967–1996); cardinal-priest pro hac vice
Albert Vanhoye (2006–2021); promoted to cardinal-priest pro hac vice in 2016
Fernando Vérgez Alzaga (2022–present)

Gallery

References

External links

Titular churches
Roman Catholic churches completed in 1958
20th-century Roman Catholic church buildings in Italy
Rome Q. IV Salario